Aagaard Glacier, also known as Glaciar Alderete, is an  long Antarctic glacier which lies close to the east of Gould Glacier and flows in a southerly direction into Mill Inlet, on the east coast of Graham Land.

See also
 List of glaciers in the Antarctic
 Glaciology

References

Glaciers of Graham Land
Foyn Coast